The 2020 Wexford Senior Hurling Championship was the 110th staging of the Wexford Senior Hurling Championship since its establishment by the Wexford County Board in 1889. The original championship draw took place on 17 February 2020; however, due to the impact of the COVID-19 pandemic on Gaelic games, the draws for a rescheduled championship took place on 22 June 2020 with a new format being adopted. The championship eventually began on 17 July 2020 and ended on 23 August 2020.

St Martin's were the defending champions; however, they were beaten by Glynn–Barntown at the quarter-final stage.

On 23 August 2020, Shelmaliers won the championship after a 3-18 to 3-11 win over Naomh Éanna in the final. This was their second championship title overall and their first title since 2014.

Revised format

The championship originally featured two groups of six team but was redrawn to consist of four groups of three teams. The redrawn groups were decided by an open draw. Relegation for the 2020 season will be abolished.

Team changes

To Championship

Promoted from the Wexford Intermediate Hurling Championship
 Cloughbawn

From Championship

Relegated to the Wexford Intermediate Hurling Championship
 Oylegate–Glenbrien

Results

Group A

Group A table

Group A fixtures

Group B

Group B table

Group B fixtures

Group C

Group C table

Group C fixtures

Group D

Group D table

Group D fixtures

Knock-out stage

Quarter-finals

Semi-finals

Final

Championship statistics

Top scorers

Overall

In a single game

References

Wexford Senior Hurling Championship
Wexford Senior Hurling Championship
Wexford Senior Hurling Championship